Joan Brody is an American World Champion bridge player. She won the Women's Team event in Wroclaw in 2022.

Bridge accomplishments

Wins
 World Bridge Series Women Teams (1) 2022

Personal life
Brody lives in Livingston, New Jersey.

References

External links
 

American contract bridge players
Living people
People from Livingston, New Jersey
Year of birth missing (living people)
Place of birth missing (living people)